Bahrain has competed in 10 Summer Olympic Games. They have never competed in the Winter Olympic Games.

All the Bahraini Olympic medals were won by naturalized African long-distance runners. The country's first podium was a bronze in the women's 1500 meters run, by the former Ethiopian Maryam Yusuf Jamal in the 2012 London Summer Olympics. IOC reallocated the medals in Women's 1500 m event due to the disqualification of the gold and silver medallists Aslı Çakır Alptekin and Gamze Bulut, and bronze medalist Jamal advanced to the gold. Four years later in the 2016 Rio Olympics, two Kenyan women got Bahrain's first gold and silver medals, Ruth Jebet in the 3000m steeplechase and Eunice Kirwa in the marathon. At the 2008 Summer Olympics in Beijing, the former Moroccan Rashid Ramzi was originally awarded the gold medal in athletics in men's 1,500 meters but it was later stripped due to a doping violation.

Medal tables

Medals by Summer Games

Medals by sport

List of medalists

See also
 List of flag bearers for Bahrain at the Olympics
 Bahrain at the Paralympics

References

External links
 
 
 

 
Olympics